Rob Herring (born 27 April 1990) is an Irish rugby union player for Ulster in the United Rugby Championship and Heineken Cup. He plays as a hooker.

Born in Cape Town, South Africa, Herring hails from one of South Africa's oldest and well known schools, South African College Schools (SACS). He joined London Irish academy in 2009, and made his senior debut for the team in 2010, but was not offered a senior contract, and returned to South Africa to continue his studies. He played for Western Province's under-21 team, and appeared in the Varsity Cup for Stellenbosch University. On the basis of these performances, both Ulster and Connacht showed interest, aware he qualified to play for Ireland through his Irish grandfather. Both teams offered him a two-year development contract, but Herring asked for a six-month trial so he could continue his studies if it didn't work out, and Ulster agreed. He signed for Ulster ahead of the 2012–13 season.

Initially used as a backup to team captain Rory Best, he got first-team opportunities when Best was on Ireland duty. He was named captain in Best's absence during the 2015 Rugby World Cup, and shared the captaincy with Andrew Trimble during the 2016–17 season after Best stepped down from the role. He made his 100th appearance for the province in September 2016. Since Best's retirement in 2019, Herring has been Ulster's first choice hooker. He made his 200th appearance for Ulster in October 2021.

In January 2014, Herring was included in the provisional 44 man Ireland squad for the 2014 Six Nations Championship. He made his debut for Ireland in June 2014 coming off the bench in a tour match against Argentina. On 16 October 2019, Herring was called into the Ireland squad for the 2019 Rugby World Cup to replace the injured Seán Cronin. He started all five of Ireland's matches in the 2020 Six Nations Championship. He was named in Ireland's 2023 Six Nations Championship squad and went on to score a try in the final match as Ireland won the Grand Slam and Triple crown.

References

External links

Ulster Rugby profile
United Rugby Championship profile

Ireland profile

Living people
1990 births
Ulster Rugby players
South African people of Irish descent
Ireland international rugby union players
Ireland Wolfhounds international rugby union players
London Irish players
Western Province (rugby union) players
South African rugby union players
Irish rugby union players
London Welsh RFC players
Rugby union hookers
Rugby union players from Cape Town